Gordon MacDonald (December 26, 1873 – February 24, 1941) was a politician from Alberta, Canada.

MacDonald was first elected to the Alberta Legislature in the 1913 general election. He defeated Conservative candidate F.D. Armitage by 11 votes to win his first term in office.  He enlisted in World War I and went to fight overseas while still a member of the Assembly. He was acclaimed to his seat in the 1917 general election under Section 38 of the Elections Act, which stipulated that an incumbent member involved in combat would be automatically returned without challenge in his district. MacDonald retired from provincial politics at the end of his term in 1921.

External links

Gordon MacDonald - Canadian Great War Project
Alberta Legislature Membership Listing

 

1866 births
1941 deaths
Alberta Liberal Party MLAs
Canadian military personnel of World War I